Lizzanello is a town and comune in the  province of Lecce in the Apulia region of south-east Italy.  
 
Lizzanello is located in the southeastern suburb of Lecce (6 km far), next to Cavallino, and is part of Salento. The municipality borders with Caprarica di Lecce, Castri di Lecce, Cavallino, Lecce and Vernole. It counts the hamlet (frazione) of Merine.

People
 Cosimo De Giorgi (1842-1922), scientist

References

External links

Official website

Cities and towns in Apulia
Localities of Salento